The 2002 Monte Carlo Rally (formally the 70th Rallye Automobile de Monte-Carlo) was the first round of the 2002 World Rally Championship. The race was held over three days between 18 January and 20 January 2002, and was won by Subaru's Tommi Mäkinen, his 24th win in the World Rally Championship.  Citroën's Sébastien Loeb, won the rally temporarily but received a two-minute time penalty due to an illegal tire change during the second day.

Background

Entry list

Itinerary
All dates and times are CET (UTC+1).

Results

Overall

World Rally Cars

Classification

Special stages

Championship standings

Junior World Rally Championship

Classification

Special stages

Championship standings

References

External links 
 Official website of the World Rally Championship

Monte Carlo
Monte Carlo Rally
Rally
Monte Carlo Rally